Telimomab aritox is a mouse monoclonal antibody which is an immunosuppressive drug. The antibody is linked to the A chain of the ricin protein (which is reflected by the aritox in the drug's name).

See also
 Zolimomab aritox

References

Monoclonal antibodies